Dobrá čajovna ("Dobrá" Tea Room, Good Tearoom, Good T Room, Dobrá čajovňa etc.) is a tea house franchise originating in the city of Prague in the Czech Republic, but which has since opened in many other cities around the world including Budapest (Hungary), Krakow (Poland) and Bratislava (Slovakia), as well as Burlington, Vermont, Madison, Wisconsin, Portland, Maine and Asheville, North Carolina in the United States. There are two Dobrá Čajovna in Prague. One on Václavské Náměstí (Wenceslas Square) and another between Karlovo Naměsti and Narodní Třida.

The original Dobrá Čajovna is the one situated on Wenceslas Square. During the Communist Era, private tea import was forbidden. However, a small group of tea lovers who would meet to sample and try different teas that were imported illegally. After the Velvet Revolution this group opened a tea room which is the same now one on Wenceslas Square.  There is a Dobrá Čajovna in almost every major town in the Czech Republic. Pardubice, České Budějovice, Tábor, Chomutov, Český Těšín, Zlín, Ostrava, Kutná Hora, Olomouc, Brno, Český Krumlov, Cheb, Karlovy Vary and others.

 Dobrá (meaning "good" in Czech) Čajovna specializes in serving fine loose-leaf teas brewed and served expertly in the manner of each tea's country of origin. The staff (known as Tea Devotees) are specially trained for all the varieties of tea they carry, and are very careful with water temperature and steeping time to try for the best possible cup.

There is a diverse selection of teas available, from Indian chai and Darjeeling to Chinese white tea, pu-erh, Keemun and Japanese matcha, and even a full-leaf Earl Grey. Also served are pastries, couscous with fruit, spiced pita and other snacks to complement the beverages.

External links
Official Dobra Tea US Site
Dobra Cajovna's Czech Site

Companies based in Prague
Tea houses
Retail companies of the Czech Republic
Czech brands